{{DISPLAYTITLE:Eta2 Coronae Australis}}

Eta2 Coronae Australis (Eta2 CrA), Latinized from η2 Coronae Australis, is a solitary star located in the southern constellation of Corona Australis. It is visible to the naked eye as a dim, blue-white hued star with an apparent visual magnitude of 5.59. At its current distance Eta2 CrA's brightness is diminished by 0.27 magnitudes due to stellar extinction from interstellar dust and it has an absolute magnitude of −0.24.

This object has a stellar classification of B9 IV, indicating that is a slightly evolved a B-type subgiant star. However, Zorec & Royer (2012) model it to be a dwarf star that has completed 80.4% of its main sequence lifetime. It is estimated to be 213 million years old and it has a mass that is 3.23 times that of the Sun. Some earlier catalogues listed the object as a chemically peculiar star but that status is now considered to be doubtful.

Sources 

B-type subgiants

Corona Australis
Corona Australis, Eta2
CD-43 12854
173861
092382
7068
Coronae Australis, 26